Cold Brook Township is located in Warren County, Illinois, United States. As of the 2010 census, its population was 467 and it contained 196 housing units.

Geography

Demographics

References

External links
City-data.com
Illinois State Archives

1853 establishments in Illinois
Galesburg, Illinois micropolitan area
Populated places established in 1853
Townships in Warren County, Illinois
Townships in Illinois